Leonard Glenn Christian (born September 22, 1965) is an American politician and businessman. Christian serves as a member of the Washington House of Representatives, representing the 4th district. He was appointed to the state House in 2014 to fill out the remainder of the term of Representative Larry Crouse.

Early life and education 
Christian was born in Los Angeles and raised in Spokane, Washington, where he graduated from Joel E. Ferris High School. Christian earned an Associate degree from the Community College of the Air Force, Bachelor of Science from Embry–Riddle Aeronautical University, and MBA from Webster University. Christian served in the United States Air Force and retired as a Master sergeant.

Career 
Christian has worked as a real estate broker in Spokane Valley, Washington since 2007.

Christian was appointed to the state legislature on January 8, 2014, by the Spokane County Board of Commissioners, despite being the second choice of the Republican Precinct Committee Officers from the district. Christian filled the vacancy left after Larry Crouse resigned from his seat in the legislature on December 31, 2013, because of health problems. In 2010, he fell 12.5 points short of unseating the incumbent Spokane County Auditor, Vicky Dalton.

Christian announced that he was running to challenge Rep. Matt Shea in the 2020 Republican primary after Rep. Shea was expelled from the House Republican caucus for alleged involvement in domestic terrorism.

Awards 
 2014 Guardians of Small Business award. Presented by NFIB.

References

External links 
 Leonard Christian at votesmart.org

Living people
Republican Party members of the Washington House of Representatives
1965 births
People from Spokane Valley, Washington
Place of birth missing (living people)
United States Air Force non-commissioned officers